The Iraq FA Baghdad Cup was a regional knockout cup competition organised by the Iraq Central Football Association (IFA) in the 1973–74 season for teams from Baghdad and its neighbouring cities. Only one edition was played because the IFA decided to bring back the national cup tournament, the Iraq FA Cup, to be the primary knockout cup competition in Iraqi football. The tournament was won by Al-Quwa Al-Jawiya, beating Al-Sikak Al-Hadeed 2–1 in the final.

Jamieat Baghdad were banned from competing in the tournament by the IFA due to events that took place in, and their withdrawal from, their match against Kahrabaa Al-Wusta B in a second-tier league game.

Bracket

Matches

Semi-finals

Final

References

External links
 Iraqi Football Website

Iraq FA Baghdad Cup
Cup